Sagittunio is a genus of freshwater mussels, aquatic bivalve mollusks in the family Unionidae.

Species
There are four recognized species:
 Sagittunio aldermani Watters, 2018
 Sagittunio nasutus (Say, 1817)
 Sagittunio subrostratus (Say, 1831)
 Sagittunio vaughanianus (Lea I., 1838)

References

 
Bivalve genera